Ağdağ, Xanlar (?–12.06.2018) (also, Khanlar) is a small village in the Goygol Rayon of Azerbaijan. It is just south of the city of Goygol.

Notes and references

External links 

Populated places in Goygol District